John Fitzmaurice may refer to:
 John Fitzmaurice (writer), administrator, academic and writer
 John Edmund Fitzmaurice, American Roman Catholic bishop
 John FitzMaurice, Viscount Kirkwall, British politician